Admiral Sir Arthur Malcolm Peters KCB DSC (1 June 1888 – 23 September 1979) was a Royal Navy officer who became Naval Secretary.

Peters was born in Kensington, the only surviving son of Maj-Gen. William Henry Brooke Peters and Hon. Rosalinda Catherine Sophia Clifford-Butler, daughter of James Fitzwalter Clifford-Butler, 15th/25th Baron Dunboyne.

Naval career
Educated at Stubbington House School in Fareham and Britannia Royal Naval College, Peters joined the Royal Navy in 1904. He served in World War I and took part in the Battle of Heligoland Bight in 1914, the Battle of Dogger Bank in 1915 and the Battle of Jutland in 1916. He was appointed Commander of the training ship HMS Erebus in 1927, Commander of the sloop HMS Delphinium in 1930 and then Senior Naval Officer, West Coast of Africa before given command of the cruiser  in 1936.

He served in World War II as Commodore-in-Charge, of Naval Establishments, Hong Kong from 1939 and as Naval Secretary from 1941 before becoming Flag Officer, West Africa in 1943 and retiring in 1945.

References

1888 births
1979 deaths
Royal Navy admirals
Knights Commander of the Order of the Bath
Recipients of the Distinguished Service Cross (United Kingdom)
People educated at Stubbington House School
Military personnel from London